Air Chief Marshal Sir Gareth Thomas Butler Clayton,  (13 November 1914 – 5 February 1992) was a senior Royal Air Force officer who served as Air Secretary from 1970 to 1972.

RAF career
Clayton joined the Royal Air Force in 1936. He served in the Second World War as a Flight Commander with No. 25 Squadron and then with No. 100 Squadron before being appointed Officer Commanding No. 576 Squadron in 1943 and then Deputy Station Commander at RAF Faldingworth in 1944. He then served on the Air Staff at No. 1 Group and as a Staff Officer on the Future Operational Plans Staff at the Air Ministry.

After the War he became Air Attaché in Lisbon and then Station Commander first at RAF Cottesmore and then at RAF Honington. He was appointed Director of Operations – Air Transport & Overseas Theatres in 1959, Air Officer Commanding No. 11 Group in 1962 and Chief  of Staff for the Second Tactical Air Force in 1963. He went on to be Director-General of RAF Personnel Services in 1966, Chief of Staff at Headquarters RAF Strike Command in 1969 and Air Secretary in 1970 before retiring in 1972.

He is buried in the churchyard of St Mary's, Polstead, Suffolk.

Further reading

References

 

|-
 

1914 births
1992 deaths
Knights Commander of the Order of the Bath
Recipients of the Distinguished Flying Cross (United Kingdom)
Royal Air Force air marshals
Royal Air Force personnel of World War II